Tea seed oil (also known as camellia oil, camellia seed oil, teanut oil) is an edible plant oil. It is obtained from the seeds of Camellia oleifera.

Camellia sasanqua is also given as a source of 'tea seed oil.

Description
The genus Camellia includes several commercially important species - Camellia oleifera is grown mainly in China for vegetable oil. The oil is known as 'camellia oil', 'tea seed oil', or 'camellia seed oil'. As of 2016  of oleifera forest centered on the Yangtze river basin in Hunan, Jiangxi, and Guangxi produces 0.26 million tons of oil.

Wild Camellia oleifera contains ~47% oil, whilst cultivated varieties have shown oil content from 42 to 53%. Oil analysis of cultivated varieties showed : ~76-82% oleic acid; 5-11% linoleic acid; 7.5-10% palmitic acid; 1.5-3% stearic acid - the ratios are similar to that found in wild oleifera. The composition is similar to that of Olive oil. Another analysis of several cultivars found : 82-84% unsaturated acids of which 68-77% oleic acid; and 7-14% polyunsaturated acids.

Uses 

The oil has also been used in Chinese traditional medicine - here it has been used as a dietary supplement for the digestive system, as well as to manage cholesterol, as well as strengthen the immune system. It was also used topically as baby lotion and for burn injuries.

Tea seed oil is commonly used to protect carbon steel cooking knives from rust.

Cautions 

Tea seed oil should not be mistaken for tea tree oil (melaleuca oil), an inedible essential oil extracted from the leaves of the paperbark, Melaleuca alternifolia, which is used for medicinal purposes.

See also
Camellia japonica, source of an oil known as Tsubaki oil. Mainly used as cooking oil and to hold a hairstyle.
Camellia sinensis, for tea production.

References

Sources

External links 
 

Cooking oils
Vegetable oils